Orzu may refer to:
Orzu, Iran
Orzu, Romania
Orzu, Tajikistan, a town in Jaloliddin Balkhi District, southern Tajikistan